Klinge may refer to:

Geography
Klinge (landform), a small, steep, V-shaped valley in southern Germany

Places
 Klinge, a village in the Lausitz region, east of the city of Cottbus in Brandenburg, Germany
 De Klinge, a Belgian town and part of the municipality of Sint-Gillis-Waas in the province of Oost-Vlaanderen

People
 Jenny Klinge (born 1975), Norwegian politician for the Centre Party
 Johannes Christoph Klinge (1851–1902), Baltic-German botanist
 Manuel Klinge (born 1984), German professional ice hockey player
 Marcel Klinge (born 1980), German politician
 Matti Klinge (born 1936), Finnish historian

Occupational surnames
Toponymic surnames